Ann Petersen (22 June 1927 – 11 December 2003) was a Belgian actress.

She was especially noted for her roles in Home Sweet Home, Pauline & Paulette, the children's serial Samson & Gert, Captain Zeppos, Wij, Heren van Zichem and Thuis.

Selected filmography
 Home Sweet Home (1973)
 Rubens (1977)
 Manneken Pis (1995)

External links
 

1927 births
2003 deaths
20th-century Flemish actresses
Flemish television actresses
Flemish film actresses
People from Wuustwezel